Brigit Jane Legg (born 29 June 1964) is a New Zealand former  cricketer who played as a right-arm medium bowler. She appeared in 3 Test matches and 18 One Day Internationals for New Zealand between 1987 and 1990. She played domestic cricket for Canterbury.

References

External links

1964 births
Living people
Cricketers from Christchurch
New Zealand women cricketers
New Zealand women Test cricketers
New Zealand women One Day International cricketers
Canterbury Magicians cricketers